Cyanuric chloride is an organic compound with the formula (NCCl)3.  This white solid is the chlorinated derivative of 1,3,5-triazine.  It is the trimer of cyanogen chloride.  Cyanuric chloride is the main precursor to the popular but controversial herbicide atrazine.

Production
Cyanuric chloride is prepared in two steps from hydrogen cyanide via the intermediacy of cyanogen chloride, which is trimerized at elevated temperatures over a carbon catalyst:
HCN  +  Cl2  →  ClCN  +  HCl

In 2005, approximately 200,000 tons were produced.

Industrial uses
It is estimated that 70% of cyanuric chloride is used in the preparation of the triazine-class pesticides, especially atrazine.  Such reactions rely on the easy displacement of the chloride with nucleophiles such as amines:
(ClCN)3  +  2 RNH2  →  (RNHCN)(ClCN)2  +  RNH3+Cl−
Other triazine herbicides, such as simazine, anilazine and cyromazine are made in an analogous way.

Cyanuric chloride is also used as a precursor to dyes and crosslinking agents. The largest class of these dyes are the sulfonated triazine-stilbene optical brighteners (OBA) or fluorescent whitening agents (FWA) commonly found in detergent formulas and white paper. Many reactive dyes also incorporate a triazine ring. They are also manufactured by way of the chloride displacement reaction shown above.

Organic synthesis
In one specialized application, cyanuric chloride is employed as a reagent in organic synthesis for the conversion of alcohols and carboxylic acids into alkyl and acyl chlorides, respectively: 

It is also used as a dehydrating agent and for the activation of carboxylic acids for reduction to alcohols.  Heating with DMF gives "Gold's reagent" Me2NCH=NCH=NMe2+Cl−, which is a versatile source of aminoalkylations and a precursor to heterocycles.

The chloride centers are easily replaced by amines to give melamine derivatives,  for example in the synthesis of dendrimers:

It is also employed the synthesis of an experimental adenosine receptor ligand.:

Cyanuric chloride can also be used as an alternative to oxalyl chloride in the Swern oxidation.

See also
Thiazyl chloride trimer - structural analogue with sulfur atoms in-place of carbon

References

Inorganic chlorine compounds
Triazines
Dehydrating agents